Lepeophtheirus elegans is a species of sea lice.

Known fish hosts are the stichaeids Chirolophis japonicus Herzenstein and Pholidapus dybowskii (Steindachner) from Russia, Japan and Korea, the pholid Pholis picta (Kner), the cottid Myoxocephalus brandtii (Steindachner), both from Russian waters and the sebastid Sebastes schlegelii Hilgendorf, the Korean rockfish.

References

External links 

 

Siphonostomatoida
Parasitic crustaceans
Animal parasites of fish
Crustaceans described in 1951